Ruth Shack (born August 24, 1931) is an American politician who served as the sponsor of the 1977 Human Rights Ordinance in Miami-Dade County, Florida. She was elected to the Metro-Dade County Commission in 1976, 1978 and 1982. After leaving the commission, she became the president and CEO of the Dade Community Foundation, one of the largest philanthropic organizations in Florida. She retired in 2009.

Education
Shack earned her Bachelor of Arts in humanities from Barry University in 1970 with a major in English and a minor in Journalism/Communications. In 1975, she received a Master of Arts in Social Science with specialization in Urban Sociology from the University of Colorado. She taught sociology and political science at Florida International University.

Professional career

Shack was elected to her first term as Metro-Dade County Commissioner in 1976, re-elected to a four-year term in 1978, and to a third term in 1982. In her tenure as a commissioner, she made the county and its municipalities reconsider their historic resources, including the Art Deco District on South Beach. In 1981, she sponsored the county's first ordinance for historic preservation.

Human Rights Ordinance

In 1977, Shack as a member of the Metro Dade County Commission sponsored the amendment to the original Dade County anti-discrimination ordinance to add the prohibition of discrimination on the basis of sexual orientation. Later her former friend Anita Bryant led a highly publicized, successful campaign to repeal the ordinance. The campaign was waged based on what was labeled "Christian beliefs regarding the sinfulness of homosexuality and the perceived threat of homosexual recruitment of children and child molestation."

Reinstatement of Ordinance
In 1998, Dade County repealed Bryant's successful campaign of 20 years earlier, and re-enacted an anti-discrimination ordinance protecting individuals from discrimination on the basis of sexual orientation by a 7 to 6 vote. In 2002, a ballot initiative to repeal the 1998 law, called Amendment 14, was voted down by 56% of the voters.

The Florida statute forbidding adoptions by homosexuals was upheld in 2004 by a federal appellate court, but on November 25, 2008, was struck down by Judge Cindy Lederman. She said the 31-year-old law violates equal protection rights for the children and their prospective parents, rejecting the state's arguments that there is "a supposed dark cloud hovering over homes of homosexuals and their children," and argued that there was no rational basis to prohibit homosexual parents from adopting, particularly since the state allowed them to act as foster parents. The ruling cleared the way for Martin Gill, 47, and his male partner to adopt two brothers, ages 4 and 8. They had been foster parents to the children since December 2004.

Philanthropy
Shack has served as vice chair of the Council on Foundations and chair of its management committee, on the Board of the Community Foundations for Youth and the Board of Funders Concerned about AIDS. She is a member of the Bertelsmann Foundations' Transatlantic Community Foundation Network and was chair of the Communications Network. She was a founder and former chair of the Florida Philanthropic Network and founder-chair of the Alliance for Human Services.

The Miami Foundation
Shack became president of the Dade Community Foundation, now known as The Miami Foundation, in 1985. During her tenure, she spearheaded a campaign to encourage philanthropy and charitable giving by developing a permanent endowment to meet Greater Miami's emerging charitable needs. Spurred by her leadership, the foundation diversified its board of trustees, its staff and its grantmaking focus. Shack led the charge to focus all grantmaking against the issue of cultural alienation and the need to help people successfully cross ethnic barriers. Empowerment and seed funding for emerging groups, based in the diverse multicultural communities of Miami-Dade, were the hallmarks of the grantmaking program under her leadership.

On January 27, 2009, Shack announced that she would step down from her post as president by the end of the year. The Miami Foundation has established the Ruth and Richard Shack Society. In addition, each year The Miami Foundation and Leave a Legacy present the Ruth Shack Leadership Award to one of Miami's most promising young leaders.

Personal life
In 1953, Shack married Richard Shack (1926 - 2012). They have three daughters, five grandchildren, and two great-grandchildren.

Awards
Shack is the recipient of the Governor's Award for the Arts; American Institute of Architects Community Service Award; Presidential Award from the Cultural Executives Council; Tropical Audubon's Conservation Award; Society of the Arts, Florida South Chapter; Miami Beach Taxpayer's Association, Public Enlightenment; and Dade County's Outstanding Citizens Award.

References

http://www.latimes.com/news/nationworld/nation/la-na-gay-adopt4-2008dec04,0,642864.story
https://news.yahoo.com/s/ap/20081125/ap_on_re_us/gay_adoptions
Steve Rothaus, "Gay Rights Debate Rages on 30 Years After Miami Dade Challenge", Miami Herald, June 9, 2007
http://www.miamiherald.com/news/miami-dade/story/879885.html

External links
 Official website

1931 births
Living people
Women in Florida politics
County commissioners in Florida
People from Brooklyn
Barry University alumni
University of Colorado alumni
Florida International University faculty
American LGBT rights activists
Activists from New York (state)
American women academics
Women civil rights activists
21st-century American women
20th-century American politicians
20th-century American women politicians